Le Lamentin is a city and town, located in the French overseas department and region of Martinique. With its 62,32 km2, it is the town with the largest area of Martinique. Le Lamentin, with near to 40 000 inhabitants, is the second most populated town of Martinique, after Fort-de-France. It is also the first industrial town and the heart of the island's economy.

Geography
The town, incorporated in the region of Fort-de-France, is located in the center of the island of Martinique. Originally a giant swamp land and mangrove region, it is now a riparian town, located by the sea in the Bay of Fort-de-France and crossed by the island's longest river (36 km): the Lézarde.

Climate
Le Lamentin has a tropical monsoon climate (Köppen climate classification Am).

History
This low region of Martinique, with its mangroves and flooded lands, keeps in its name the memory of the pacific manatees, hunted for their meat by the island's first inhabitants. The river La Lézarde was frequently visited by Manatees, now extinct in the Lesser Antilles. The legend says that, once upon a time, a manatee was found dead on the river banks and since then, the town has adopted the name Le Lamentin. Nowadays, a symbolic statue of a manatee rests in front of city hall.

Population

Economy
Le Lamentin is Martinique's economical and industrial center. Specialized mainly in tertiary industries, it is home to five industrial zones and two joint development zones (La Lézarde, La Jambette, Les Mangles Acajou, Les hauts de Californie, Place d'Armes, Lareinty and Manhity), an oil refinery named La Sara and the two largest shopping centers of the island (La Galleria and Place d'Armes). On the administrative aspect, Le Lamentin is home to large groups such as the Caisse Générale de Sécurité Sociale, the Caisse d'Allocations Familiales and the Chambers of Agriculture. It also houses the headquarters of various groups such as Société Martiniquaise des Eaux (the island's water company) and banks such as Crédit Agricole. The town of Le Lamentin is also home to the island's only international airport, Martinique Aimé Césaire International Airport, named after local author and politician Aimé Césaire. The airport had, in 2019, a total passenger traffic of 2,050,030 people and represents the 12th busiest airport in the Caribbean, just behind Guadeloupe and Curaçao.

Twin towns
Santiago de Cuba, Cuba
Treichville, Côte d'Ivoire

See also

Communes of the Martinique department

References

External links
 Official website (in French)
 Martinique Aimé Césaire International Airport (in French)

Communes of Martinique
Populated places in Martinique